Haut-Loquin is a commune in the Pas-de-Calais department in the Hauts-de-France region of France.

Geography
A small village situated 11 miles (18 km) west of Saint-Omer, on the D216 road.

Population

Places of interest
 The church of St.Peter, dating from the eleventh century.

See also
Communes of the Pas-de-Calais department

References

External links

 Statistical data, INSEE

Hautloquin